Savoia-Marchetti heavy fighter prototypes were Italian twin-engined heavy fighter prototypes of World War II. All featured a dual-fuselage structure and used German Daimler-Benz engines. 

It may refer to:

 Savoia-Marchetti SM.88
 Savoia-Marchetti SM.91
 Savoia-Marchetti SM.92

Savoia-Marchetti aircraft